Spendthrift  is a 1936 American romance film directed by Raoul Walsh, starring Henry Fonda, Pat Paterson, Mary Brian and George Barbier and released by Paramount Pictures.

Cast
Henry Fonda as Townsend Middleton
Pat Paterson as Valerie 'Boots' O'Connell
Mary Brian as Sally Barnaby
George Barbier as Uncle Morton Middleton
Edward Brophy as Bill McGuire
Richard Carle as Popsy
J.M. Kerrigan 	as Pop O'Connell
Spencer Charters as Col. Barnaby
June Brewster as Topsy Martin
Halliwell Hobbes as Beuhl - the Butler
Jerry Mandy as Enrico
Miki Morita as Valet
Greta Meyer as Hilda - the Maid
Robert Strange as Ransom

Reception
The film recorded a loss of $126,925.

References

External links
 

1936 films
1930s romance films
Paramount Pictures films
Films produced by Walter Wanger
American black-and-white films
American romance films
Films directed by Raoul Walsh
1930s English-language films
1930s American films